James Butler of Duiske (Irish: Séamas de Buitléir an Dubhuisce) was a younger son of James Butler, 9th Earl of Ormond and Lady Joan Fitzgerald. In 1576, Queen Elizabeth I of England awarded him the lands of Duiske Abbey which had been confiscated by the Crown.

Marriage and issue
Butler married Mary Edwards circa 1540 and had two sons:
 George Butler of Wexford 1562 - 1626
 Walter Butler

See also
 Butler dynasty

References

16th-century Irish people
James
People from County Kilkenny
Younger sons of earls
Year of birth unknown
Year of death unknown